Integrative Biology is a monthly peer-reviewed scientific journal covering the interface between biology and the fields of physics, chemistry, engineering, imaging, and informatics. It was published by the Royal Society of Chemistry from its launch in 2008 until 2018. Since 2019 it has been published by Oxford University Press. Its 2021 impact factor is 3.177.

External links 
 

Biology journals
Publications established in 2008
Oxford University Press academic journals
Monthly journals
English-language journals